The Universitas Istropolitana (since the 16th century frequently – but incorrectly – referred to as Academia Istropolitana) in Bratislava ( / ) was arguably the third university to be found in the Kingdom of Hungary and the first university to be founded in the territory of present-day Slovakia. Despite its brief existence (1465–1491), it features prominently in Slovak historiography.

Name 
The word "Istropolitana" is taken from the ancient Greek name for Bratislava, Istropolis, which means "Danube City".

History 
It was founded in 1465 by Pope Paul II on the request of the Hungarian king Matthias Corvinus. It was the only university in the Kingdom of Hungary at that time, although historically not the first in the kingdom. Many well-known lecturers from Austria, Italy and elsewhere taught at the school, such as Galeotto Marzio (:de:Galeotto Marzio) and János Vitéz. Regiomontanus served as the chair in mathematics while the court astrologer for Corvinus, Marcin Bylica, was the chair in astrology from the university's inception.  The university ceased to exist around 1490 after the death of Matthias Corvinus.

Building 
When a wealthy local citizen Gmaitl died in 1467 and his real estate became the crown's property, king Matthias Corvinus decided to use them to house the university that was being established.

The renaissance university building still stands in Bratislava, currently housing the Academy of Performing Arts in Bratislava, situated at Ventúrska street 3.

See also 

 List of medieval universities

References 

Bratislava City - Academia Istropolitana

1465 establishments in Europe
1490 disestablishments in Europe
Educational institutions established in the 15th century
History of Bratislava
Education in Bratislava
Buildings and structures in Bratislava